Michael Edward Baumgartner (born January 30, 1949) is an American former ice hockey defenseman who played 17 games in the National Hockey League (NHL) with the Kansas City Scouts during the 1974–75 season. A native of Minnesota, Baumgartner played high school hockey there before attending the University of North Dakota. He was selected by the Chicago Black Hawks in the 1969 NHL Amateur Draft, though was traded from the team before playing for them. Baumgartner made his professional debut in 1971 in the Central Hockey League, and spent three seasons there before he made his NHL debut in 1974, but an eye injury forced him to stop after 17 games. He played one final game in the minor American Hockey League before retiring from playing in 1976.

Playing career
Mike Baumgartner played his amateur hockey at the University of North Dakota and was drafted in the 5th round by the Chicago Black Hawks. After two years in the Central Hockey League (CHL) playing for the Dallas Blackhawks, Mike was traded to the Atlanta Flames for Lynn Powis on August 30, 1973  After a 43-point season with the Omaha Knights of the CHL, the Flames traded Baumgartner to the Montreal Canadiens for cash. Before playing a game with Montreal, Baumgartner was sold to the expansion Kansas City Scouts on August 22, 1974 

Mike made his NHL debut for the Scouts at Maple Leaf Gardens against the Toronto Maple Leafs on October 9, 1974 and played his final NHL game on December 14, 1974 against the Vancouver Canucks suffering a career ending eye injury. Mike went pointless in 17 regular season games. Mike played 1 game with the Springfield Indians of the American Hockey League the next season before retiring.

Mike and wife Sandy, who he met at UND where she was a cheerleader, settled post-hockey in Mike's native Roseau, Minnesota. The Baumgartners farmed for 37 years raising wheat, sunflowers and other grass seeds. As of November 2018, Mike and Sandy had four children and ten grandchildren. (Icing on the Plains: The Rough Ride of Kansas City's NHL Scouts, p. 108, Troy Treasure, Balboa Press)

Career statistics

Regular season and playoffs

References

External links
 

1949 births
Living people
American men's ice hockey defensemen
Chicago Blackhawks draft picks
Dallas Black Hawks players
Ice hockey players from Minnesota
Kansas City Scouts players
North Dakota Fighting Hawks men's ice hockey players
Omaha Knights (CHL) players
People from Roseau, Minnesota
Springfield Indians players